In classical deductive logic, a consistent theory is one that does not lead to a logical contradiction. The lack of contradiction can be defined in either semantic or syntactic terms. The semantic definition states that a theory is consistent if it has a model, i.e., there exists an interpretation under which all formulas in the theory are true. This is the sense used in traditional Aristotelian logic, although in contemporary mathematical logic the term satisfiable is used instead. Let  be a set of closed sentences (informally "axioms") and  the set of closed sentences provable from  under some (specified, possibly implicitly) formal deductive system. The set of axioms  is consistent when  for no formula .

If there exists a deductive system for which these semantic and syntactic definitions are equivalent for any theory formulated in a particular deductive logic, the logic is called complete. The completeness of the sentential calculus was proved by Paul Bernays in 1918 and Emil Post in 1921, while the completeness of predicate calculus was proved by Kurt Gödel in 1930, and consistency proofs for arithmetics restricted with respect to the induction axiom schema were proved by Ackermann (1924), von Neumann (1927) and Herbrand (1931). Stronger logics, such as second-order logic, are not complete.

A consistency proof is a mathematical proof that a particular theory is consistent. The early development of mathematical proof theory was driven by the desire to provide finitary consistency proofs for all of mathematics as part of Hilbert's program.  Hilbert's program was strongly impacted by the incompleteness theorems, which showed that sufficiently strong proof theories cannot prove their consistency (provided that they are consistent).

Although consistency can be proved using model theory, it is often done in a purely syntactical way, without any need to reference some model of the logic. The cut-elimination (or equivalently the normalization of the underlying calculus if there is one) implies the consistency of the calculus: since there is no cut-free proof of falsity, there is no contradiction in general.

Consistency and completeness in arithmetic and set theory
In theories of arithmetic, such as Peano arithmetic, there is an intricate relationship between the consistency of the theory and its completeness. A theory is complete if, for every formula φ in its language, at least one of φ or ¬φ is a logical consequence of the theory.

Presburger arithmetic is an axiom system for the natural numbers under addition. It is both consistent and complete.

Gödel's incompleteness theorems show that any sufficiently strong recursively enumerable theory of arithmetic cannot be both complete and consistent. Gödel's theorem applies to the theories of Peano arithmetic (PA) and primitive recursive arithmetic (PRA), but not to Presburger arithmetic.

Moreover, Gödel's second incompleteness theorem shows that the consistency of sufficiently strong recursively enumerable theories of arithmetic can be tested in a particular way. Such a theory is consistent if and only if it does not prove a particular sentence, called the Gödel sentence of the theory, which is a formalized statement of the claim that the theory is indeed consistent. Thus the consistency of a sufficiently strong, recursively enumerable, consistent theory of arithmetic can never be proven in that system itself. The same result is true for recursively enumerable theories that can describe a strong enough fragment of arithmetic—including set theories such as Zermelo–Fraenkel set theory (ZF).  These set theories cannot prove their own Gödel sentence—provided that they are consistent, which is generally believed.

Because consistency of ZF is not provable in ZF, the weaker notion  is interesting in set theory (and in other sufficiently expressive axiomatic systems). If T is a theory and A is an additional axiom, T + A is said to be consistent relative to T (or simply that A is consistent with T) if it can be proved that
if T is consistent then T + A is consistent. If both A and ¬A are consistent with T, then A is said to be independent of T.

First-order logic

Notation
 (Turnstile symbol) in the following context of mathematical logic, means "provable from". That is,  reads: b is provable from a (in some specified formal system). See List of logic symbols. In other cases, the turnstile symbol may mean implies; permits the derivation of. See: List of mathematical symbols.

Definition
Otherwise  is inconsistent (written ).
 is said to be maximally consistent if  is consistent and for every formula ,  implies .

Basic results
 The following are equivalent:
 
 For all 
 Every satisfiable set of formulas is consistent, where a set of formulas  is satisfiable if and only if there exists a model  such that .
 For all  and :
 if not , then ;
 Let  be a maximally consistent set of formulas and suppose it contains witnesses.  For all  and :
 if , then ,
  if and only if there is a term  such that .

Henkin's theorem
Let  be a set of symbols. Let  be a maximally consistent set of -formulas containing witnesses.

Define an equivalence relation  on the set of -terms by  if , where  denotes equality. Let  denote the equivalence class of terms containing ; and let  where  is the set of terms based on the set of symbols .

 for each -ary relation symbol , define  if 
 for each -ary function symbol , define 
 for each constant symbol , define 

Then for each -formula :

Sketch of proof
There are several things to verify. First, that  is in fact an equivalence relation.  Then, it needs to be verified that (1), (2), and (3) are well defined.  This falls out of the fact that  is an equivalence relation and also requires a proof that (1) and (2) are independent of the choice of  class representatives.  Finally,  can be verified by induction on formulas.

Model theory 

In ZFC set theory with classical first-order logic, an inconsistent theory  is one such that there exists a closed sentence  such that  contains both  and its negation . A consistent theory is one such that the following logically equivalent conditions hold

See also

Cognitive dissonance
Equiconsistency
Hilbert's problems
Hilbert's second problem
Jan Łukasiewicz
Paraconsistent logic
ω-consistency
Gentzen's consistency proof
Proof by contradiction

Footnotes

References
 
 10th impression 1991.

 (pbk.)

External links

Proof theory
Hilbert's problems
Metalogic